Tabberer is a surname. Notable people with the surname include:

Charles Arthur Tabberer (1915-1942), American naval officer
Horace Tabberer Brown (1848–1925), British chemist
Maggie Tabberer (born 1936), Australian television personality
Ralph Tabberer (born 1954), British civil servant